Spicomacrurus is a genus of rattails.

Species
There are currently 4 recognized species in this genus:
 Spicomacrurus adelscotti (Iwamoto & Merrett, 1997) (Celebration whiptail)
 Spicomacrurus dictyogadus Iwamoto, K. T. Shao & H. C. Ho, 2011 (Net-throat grenadier)
 Spicomacrurus kuronumai (Kamohara, 1938) (Kuronuma's whiptail)
 Spicomacrurus mccoskeri Iwamoto, K. T. Shao & H. C. Ho, 2011 (McCosker's grenadier)

References

Macrouridae